The Association of University Centers on Disabilities (AUCD) is an American institution  that operates in the disability field, instituted after the Community Mental Health Act of 1963.  Currently, AUCD is a network that represents 67 University Centers for Excellence in Developmental Disabilities (UCEDD) in every state and territory in the United States.  AUCD has also established 43 Maternal and Child Health (MCH), Leadership Education in Neurodevelopmental and Related Disabilities (LEND) programs, and 15 Eunice Kennedy Shriver Intellectual and Developmental Disabilities Research Centers (IDDRC).

References

External links 
 

Educational organizations based in the United States
Health and disability rights organizations in the United States
Organizations based in Maryland
Organizations established in 1963
United States schools associations
1963 establishments in the United States